(sometimes Heartbeat) was a Japanese video game developer, famous for developing the sixth and seventh installments of the Dragon Quest series. Heartbeat also developed a remake of Dragon Quest IV. Plans to localize this remake in North America were halted when the employees of Heartbeat decided to take a sabbatical in January 2002. The company stated its reason was "the raise of development costs", despite the massive financial success of its games.  Several of its former members created Genius Sonority. The company now appears defunct.

Games

Super NES
Dragon Quest VI
Dragon Quest III (remake)

PlayStation
Dragon Quest VII
Dragon Quest IV (remake)

References

External links
 Heartbeat official website (Internet Archive)

Video game companies of Japan